Matthew Kelly Sharp (born September 22, 1969) is an American songwriter and musician. Until 1998, he was the bassist for the alternative rock band Weezer, which he cofounded in 1992. He appears on their first two albums, the Blue Album (1994) and Pinkerton (1996). In 1994, Sharp founded the Rentals, who have released four albums. Sharp has also released an EP and an album as a solo artist.

Early life
Matt Sharp was born in Bangkok, Thailand, to American parents on September 22, 1969. The family moved to Arlington, Virginia, when he was one year old. At the age of nine, he made his first musical purchase, a 45 rpm single of the song "Le Freak" by Chic. 
At sixteen, he moved to San Diego.

In 1989, Sharp started fronting a goth band, the Clique, which lasted less than a year. A few months after the Clique disbanded, Sharp befriended the drummer Patrick Wilson, with whom he created the band 60 Wrong Sausages. The guitarist Jason Cropper soon joined. Around this time, Wilson was also in another band, Fuzz, with the guitarist and vocalist Rivers Cuomo. For a brief period, Cuomo, Wilson and Sharp shared an apartment. During this time, Sharp worked as a telemarketer.

Career

1991–1999: Weezer and the Rentals 
In mid-1991, Sharp moved north to Berkeley, California, to pursue what the Weezer collaborator Karl Koch described as "some sorta symphonic keyboard sequencing music". In January 1992, Wilson showed Sharp material he and Cuomo had been working on. Impressed, Sharp returned to Los Angeles to join the band. Sharp became the group's bassist and de facto manager.

Cuomo, Wilson, Sharp and Cropper formed Weezer on February 14, 1992. Their first show was on March 19, 1992, closing for Keanu Reeves' band Dogstar. Cuomo gave Sharp one year to get the band a record deal before Cuomo accepted a scholarship at the University of California, Berkeley. In November, Weezer recorded a demo, The Kitchen Tape, including a version of the future Weezer single "Say It Ain't So". The demo was heard by Todd Sullivan, an A&R man at Geffen Records, who signed Weezer in June 1993.

Weezer released their self-titled debut album in May 1994. It was certified platinum in January 1995. In early 1994, Sharp founded the Rentals. They released their debut album Return of the Rentals the following year, which featured the radio hit "Friends of P".

Weezer's second album, Pinkerton, was released in September 1996. With a darker, more abrasive sound, Pinkerton was a commercial and critical failure, but attained critical acclaim later. Following the mixed response to Pinkerton, Weezer went on a five-year hiatus. In 1998, Sharp left Weezer due to differences with the band members. In 2016, he said of his departure: "I don't really know how to speak on this because I don't know what should be kept private and what should be shared. I certainly have my view of it, as I'm sure everybody else has their sort of foggy things. When you have a group that doesn't communicate, you're going to have a whole lot of different stories."

In 1999, the Rentals released their second album, Seven More Minutes. Among its contributors were Damon Albarn (of Blur and Gorillaz), Donna Matthews (of Elastica), Miki Berenyi (of Lush), and Tim Wheeler (of Ash). Maya Rudolph (later of Saturday Night Live) was a member of the touring band during this time. The track "My Head is in the Sun" was co-written with Weezer frontman Rivers Cuomo. The album sold considerably less than Return of the Rentals, and the Rentals went on hiatus in late 1999.

2000–2003: Solo records and Weezer lawsuit 
Sharp moved to the town of Leiper's Fork, Tennessee, and began recording. In an interview with MTV News, Sharp said he was trying to cut ties to the music world. Sharp went on an acoustic tour in 2002 with former Cake guitarist Greg Brown. In 2003, after a four-year hiatus, Sharp returned with an EP, Puckett's Versus the Country Boy.

On April 19, 2002, Sharp filed a five-count federal lawsuit against Weezer. He alleged he was owed royalties for co-writing Weezer's first hit, "Undone – The Sweater Song", and that he owned a 25% interest in the first nine tracks of Pinkerton, which had been credited solely to Cuomo. Sharp also claimed he had handled most of Weezer's business affairs during their early success, including the hiring of accountants and attorneys, as well as helping the band secure their record deal. The lawsuit also stated that Cuomo was going to ask him to appear in the music video for their 2001 song "Island in the Sun". Finally, Sharp charged his former bandmates with breach of fiduciary duty, legal malpractice, dissolution of partnership, and declaratory relief. The lawsuit was settled out of court.

2003–present: Reunion with Cuomo, re-formation of the Rentals 
In 2003, Sharp released a solo EP, followed by a self-titled solo album in 2004. He continued to tour in 2004–2005 with the band Goldenboy.

On February 12, 2004, Weezer frontman Rivers Cuomo sat in during a solo performance by Sharp at California State University, Fullerton. They played four songs together: the Sharp/Cuomo collaborations "Mrs. Young" and "Time Song", and the Weezer songs "Say It Ain't So" and "Undone". Sharp announced at the show that he and Cuomo would be working on a record together. Later in 2004, Sharp announced on his website that although he and Cuomo had come up with "15 or 16 new song ideas", their "special brand of dysfunctionality" might keep them from finishing the project.
In March 2004, Sharp recorded synthesizer on So Jealous by Canadian indie pop band Tegan and Sara. After a slow period in 2005, Sharp contemplated what to do next, considering either a new solo album or starting a new collaborative partnership. The possibility of him rejoining Weezer was also an option; although this did not happen, in a 2006 interview, Sharp credited these conversations with Cuomo as giving him the idea to return to writing pop music, which eventually led him to re-form the Rentals. These ideas particularly strengthened after meeting Sara Radle. In 2005, six years after 1999's Seven More Minutes, the Rentals re-formed; the new lineup included original backup vocalist Rachel Haden, Sara Radle, Ben Pringle of Nerf Herder, Lauren Chipman, and Dan Joeright. Sharp and the Rentals toured North America in the summers of 2006 and 2007.

The Rentals released The Last Little Life EP on August 14, 2007. Between Rentals tours, Sharp returned to work in early 2007 with Tegan and Sara on their next album, The Con, later appearing at their concerts in 2008 to play bass in a cover of Weezer's "Tired of Sex".

After the three releases in the Songs About Time series in April, July, and October 2009, Sharp and the Rentals went on hiatus. In October 2010, Sharp sold most of his equipment from his Weezer and Rentals days on eBay. His Orange Matamp Lead 200 was purchased by Greg Veerman, bassist of Canadian rock band San Sebastian. In November 2010, Cuomo mentioned in an interview with Spin that "the idea came up" of having Sharp rejoin the band for their "Memories Tour", in which they play The Blue Album and Pinkerton. Cuomo said: "I think we left that idea behind pretty early on. I don't remember. I wasn't involved in the discussion so I don't know what the issues were."

In 2011 Sharp provided guest vocals on the song "FAQ" by Berri Txarrak, a Basque band whose live album Zertarako Amestu (2007) had significant influence on Songs About Time.

Discography

Weezer
 1994 – Weezer (The Blue Album)
 1996 – Pinkerton

The Rentals
 1995 – Return of the Rentals
 1999 – Seven More Minutes
 2007 – The Last Little Life EP
 2009 – Songs About Time
 2011 – Resilience: A Benefit Album for the Relief Effort in Japan
 2014 – Lost in Alphaville
 2020 – Q36

Solo
 2003 – Puckett's Versus the Country Boy
 2004 – Matt Sharp

With Homie
 1998 – "American Girls" from the Meet the Deedles Soundtrack

With Tegan and Sara
 2004 – So Jealous
 2007 – The Con

With Berri Txarrak
 2011 – "FAQ"

References

Bibliography 
 .

External links 
 Official web site
 In-depth interview with Glorious Noise

1969 births
Living people
American rock bass guitarists
American male bass guitarists
Weezer members
American male singer-songwriters
American rock songwriters
American rock singers
The Rentals members
Power pop musicians
Matt Sharp
People from Arlington County, Virginia
20th-century American guitarists
Singer-songwriters from Virginia